The 2002 Tulsa Golden Hurricane football team represented the University of Tulsa as a member of the Western Athletic Conference (WAC) during the 2002 NCAA Division I-A football season. Led by Keith Burns in his third and final season as head coach, the Golden Hurricane compiled an overall record of 1–11 with a mark of 1–7 in conference play, tying for ninth place in the WAC. Tulsa played home games at Skelly Stadium in Tulsa, Oklahoma.

Schedule

Roster

References

Tulsa
Tulsa Golden Hurricane football seasons
Tulsa Golden Hurricane football